This page gathers the results of provincial elections in Veneto since 1995.

The direct election of the Presidents of Province was introduced in 1993 and carried out for the first time in 1995. 

Direct elections, of both Presidents and Councils, were suspended in 2012 and replaced by indirect elections in 2014. Under the new system, only mayors and municipal councillors vote for the President and the Council, often forming bipartisan or trans-party alliances.

Contextually, the Province of Venice is under the process of transformation into "Metropolitan City of Venice" and its leadership was thus not renewed in 2014.

Direct elections (1995–2012)

1995 provincial elections

|- 
!align=left rowspan=2 valign=center bgcolor="#E9E9E9"|
!colspan="3" align="center" valign=top bgcolor="lightblue"|Pole of Freedoms
!colspan="3" align="center" valign=top bgcolor="pink"|Alliance of Progressives
!colspan="3" align="center" valign=top bgcolor="lightgreen"|Lega Nord
!colspan="1" align="center" valign=top bgcolor="#E9E9E9"|Others
|-
|align="left" bgcolor="lightblue"|candidate
|align="center" bgcolor="lightblue"|1st round
|align="center" bgcolor="lightblue"|2nd round
|align="left" bgcolor="pink"|candidate
|align="center" bgcolor="pink"|1st round
|align="center" bgcolor="pink"|2nd round
|align="left" bgcolor="lightgreen"|candidate
|align="center" bgcolor="lightgreen"|1st round
|align="center" bgcolor="lightgreen"|2nd round
|align="center" bgcolor="#E9E9E9"|1st round
|-
|align="left" valign=top bgcolor="#E9E9E9" |Belluno
|align="left" valign=top bgcolor="lightblue" |Angelo Baraldo(Forza Italia)
|align="center" valign=top bgcolor="lightblue" |28.7%
|align="center" valign=top bgcolor="lightblue"|30.0%
|align="left" valign=top bgcolor="pink"|Oscar De Bona(Lega Autonomia Veneta)
|align="center" valign=top bgcolor="pink"|39.1%
|align="center" valign=top bgcolor="pink"|70.0%
|align="left" valign=top bgcolor="lightgreen"|Leonardo Colle(Liga Veneta–Lega Nord)
|align="center" valign=top bgcolor="lightgreen"|26.5%
|align="center" valign=top bgcolor="lightgreen"|-
|align="center" valign=top bgcolor="#E9E9E9"|5.7%
|-
|align="left" valign=top bgcolor="#E9E9E9"|Padua
|align="left" valign=top bgcolor="lightblue"|Pierluigi Ancilotto(Forza Italia)
|align="center" valign=top bgcolor="lightblue"|37.7%
|align="center" valign=top bgcolor="lightblue"|43.5%
|align="left" valign=top bgcolor="pink"|Ennio Ronchitelli(Labour Federation)
|align="center" valign=top bgcolor="pink"|18.7%
|align="center" valign=top bgcolor="pink"|with Sacco
|align="left" valign=top bgcolor="lightgreen"|Renzo Sacco(Liga Veneta–Lega Nord)
|align="center" valign=top bgcolor="lightgreen"|29.7%
|align="center" valign=top bgcolor="lightgreen"|56.5%
|align="center" valign=top bgcolor="#E9E9E9"|13.9%
|-
|align="left" valign=top bgcolor="#E9E9E9"|Rovigo
|align="left" valign=top bgcolor="lightblue"|Vittorio Cogo<small>(Forza Italia)
|align="center" valign=top bgcolor="lightblue"|33.2%
|align="center" valign=top bgcolor="lightblue"|41.3%
|align="left" valign=top bgcolor="pink"|Alberto Brigo<small>(Italian People's Party)
|align="center" valign=top bgcolor="pink"|36.4%
|align="center" valign=top bgcolor="pink"|58.7%
|align="left" valign=top bgcolor="lightgreen"|Cosimo Oliva(Liga Veneta–Lega Nord)
|align="center" valign=top bgcolor="lightgreen"|11.6%
|align="center" valign=top bgcolor="lightgreen"|-
|align="center" valign=top bgcolor="#E9E9E9"|18.8%
|-
|align="left" valign=top bgcolor="#E9E9E9" |Treviso
|align="left" valign=top bgcolor="lightblue" |Fausto Favaro(Forza Italia)
|align="center" valign=top bgcolor="lightblue" |31.1%
|align="center" valign=top bgcolor="lightblue"|34.8%
|align="left" valign=top bgcolor="pink"|Tiziano Gava(Democratic Party of the Left)
|align="center" valign=top bgcolor="pink"|13.4%
|align="center" valign=top bgcolor="pink"|-
|align="left" valign=top bgcolor="lightgreen"|Giovanni Mazzonetto(Liga Veneta–Lega Nord)
|align="center" valign=top bgcolor="lightgreen"|43.5%
|align="center" valign=top bgcolor="lightgreen"|65.2%
|align="center" valign=top bgcolor="#E9E9E9"|12.0%
|-
|align="left" valign=top bgcolor="#E9E9E9"|Venice
|align="left" valign=top bgcolor="lightblue"|Paolo Dalla Vecchia(Forza Italia)
|align="center" valign=top bgcolor="lightblue"|36.1%
|align="center" valign=top bgcolor="lightblue"|38.2%
|align="left" valign=top bgcolor="pink"|Luigino Busatto(Democratic Party of the Left)
|align="center" valign=top bgcolor="pink"|42.9%
|align="center" valign=top  bgcolor="pink"|61.8
|align="left" valign=top bgcolor="lightgreen"|Alberto Mazzonetto(Liga Veneta–Lega Nord)
|align="center" valign=top  bgcolor="lightgreen"|10.2%
|align="center" valign=top bgcolor="lightgreen"|-
|align="center" valign=top bgcolor="#E9E9E9"|10.8%
|-
|align="left" valign=top bgcolor="#E9E9E9"|Verona
|align="left" valign=top bgcolor="lightblue"|Aventino Frau(Forza Italia)
|align="center" valign=top bgcolor="lightblue"|44.3%
|align="center" valign=top bgcolor="lightblue"|46.0%
|align="left" valign=top bgcolor="pink"|Silvia Mostarda(Democratic Party of the Left)
|align="center" valign=top bgcolor="pink"|13.4%
|align="center" valign=top bgcolor="pink"|-
|align="left" valign=top bgcolor="lightgreen"|Antonio Borghesi(Liga Veneta–Lega Nord)
|align="center" valign=top bgcolor="lightgreen"|35.4%
|align="center" valign=top bgcolor="lightgreen"|54.0%
|align="center" valign=top bgcolor="#E9E9E9"|6.9%
|-
|align="left" valign=top bgcolor="#E9E9E9" |Vicenza
|align="left" valign=top bgcolor="lightblue" |Giuseppe Castaman(Forza Italia)
|align="center" valign=top bgcolor="lightblue" |34.0%
|align="center" valign=top bgcolor="lightblue"|38.6%
|align="left" valign=top bgcolor="pink"|Giuseppe Doppio(Italian People's Party)
|align="center" valign=top bgcolor="pink"|31.4%
|align="center" valign=top bgcolor="pink"|61.4%
|align="left" valign=top bgcolor="lightgreen"|Manuela Dal Lago(Liga Veneta–Lega Nord)
|align="center" valign=top bgcolor="lightgreen"|29.0%
|align="center" valign=top bgcolor="lightgreen"|-
|align="center" valign=top bgcolor="#E9E9E9"|5.6%
|}
Source: Regional Council of Veneto

1997 provincial elections

|- 
!align=left rowspan=2 valign=center bgcolor="#E9E9E9"|
!colspan="3" align="center" valign=top bgcolor="lightblue"|Pole for Freedoms
!colspan="3" align="center" valign=top bgcolor="pink"|The Olive Tree
!colspan="3" align="center" valign=top bgcolor="lightgreen"|Lega Nord
!colspan="1" align="center" valign=top bgcolor="#E9E9E9"|Others
|-
|align="left" bgcolor="lightblue"|candidate
|align="center" bgcolor="lightblue"|1st round
|align="center" bgcolor="lightblue"|2nd round
|align="left" bgcolor="pink"|candidate
|align="center" bgcolor="pink"|1st round
|align="center" bgcolor="pink"|2nd round
|align="left" bgcolor="lightgreen"|candidate
|align="center" bgcolor="lightgreen"|1st round
|align="center" bgcolor="lightgreen"|2nd round
|align="center" bgcolor="#E9E9E9"|1st round
|-
|align="left" valign=top bgcolor="#E9E9E9" |Vicenza
|align="left" valign=top bgcolor="lightblue" |Giuseppe Castaman(Forza Italia)
|align="center" valign=top bgcolor="lightblue" |22.0%
|align="center" valign=top bgcolor="lightblue"|-
|align="left" valign=top bgcolor="pink"|Giuseppe Doppio(Italian People's Party)
|align="center" valign=top bgcolor="pink"|25.0%
|align="center" valign=top bgcolor="pink"|37.7%
|align="left" valign=top bgcolor="lightgreen"|Manuela Dal Lago(Liga Veneta–Lega Nord)
|align="center" valign=top bgcolor="lightgreen"|41.4%
|align="center" valign=top bgcolor="lightgreen"|62.3%
|align="center" valign=top bgcolor="#E9E9E9"|11.6%
|}
Source: Istituto Cattaneo

1998 provincial elections

|- 
!align=left rowspan=2 valign=center bgcolor="#E9E9E9"|
!colspan="3" align="center" valign=top bgcolor="lightblue"|Pole for Freedoms
!colspan="3" align="center" valign=top bgcolor="pink"|The Olive Tree
!colspan="3" align="center" valign=top bgcolor="lightgreen"|Lega Nord
!colspan="1" align="center" valign=top bgcolor="#E9E9E9"|Others
|-
|align="left" bgcolor="lightblue"|candidate
|align="center" bgcolor="lightblue"|1st round
|align="center" bgcolor="lightblue"|2nd round
|align="left" bgcolor="pink"|candidate
|align="center" bgcolor="pink"|1st round
|align="center" bgcolor="pink"|2nd round
|align="left" bgcolor="lightgreen"|candidate
|align="center" bgcolor="lightgreen"|1st round
|align="center" bgcolor="lightgreen"|2nd round
|align="center" bgcolor="#E9E9E9"|1st round
|-
|align="left" valign=top bgcolor="#E9E9E9" |Treviso
|align="left" valign=top bgcolor="lightblue" |Francesco Benazzi(Forza Italia)Carla Puppinato(United Christian Democrats)
|align="center" valign=top bgcolor="lightblue" |24.1%7.2%
|align="center" valign=top bgcolor="lightblue"|40.0%
|align="left" valign=top bgcolor="pink"|Ivano Sartor(Italian People's Party)Gianni Maddalon(North-East Movement)
|align="center" valign=top bgcolor="pink"|16.8%8.7%
|align="center" valign=top bgcolor="pink"|-
|align="left" valign=top bgcolor="lightgreen"|Luca Zaia(Liga Veneta–Lega Nord)
|align="center" valign=top bgcolor="lightgreen"|41.4%
|align="center" valign=top bgcolor="lightgreen"|60.0%
|align="center" valign=top bgcolor="#E9E9E9"|1.8%
|}
Source: Istituto Cattaneo

1999 provincial elections

|- 
!align=left rowspan=2 valign=center bgcolor="#E9E9E9"|
!colspan="3" align="center" valign=top bgcolor="lightblue"|Pole for Freedoms
!colspan="3" align="center" valign=top bgcolor="pink"|The Olive Tree
!colspan="3" align="center" valign=top bgcolor="lightgreen"|Lega Nord
!colspan="1" align="center" valign=top bgcolor="#E9E9E9"|Others
|-
|align="left" bgcolor="lightblue"|candidate
|align="center" bgcolor="lightblue"|1st round
|align="center" bgcolor="lightblue"|2nd round
|align="left" bgcolor="pink"|candidate
|align="center" bgcolor="pink"|1st round
|align="center" bgcolor="pink"|2nd round
|align="left" bgcolor="lightgreen"|candidate
|align="center" bgcolor="lightgreen"|1st round
|align="center" bgcolor="lightgreen"|2nd round
|align="center" bgcolor="#E9E9E9"|1st round
|-
|align="left" valign=top bgcolor="#E9E9E9" |Belluno
|align="left" valign=top bgcolor="lightblue" |Angelo Costola(Forza Italia)
|align="center" valign=top bgcolor="lightblue" |23.5%
|align="center" valign=top bgcolor="lightblue"|34.5%
|align="left" valign=top bgcolor="pink"|Oscar De Bona(Dolomitic Agreement)Livio Viel(Democrats of the Left)Giuseppe Fascina(The Democrats)
|align="center" valign=top bgcolor="pink"|38.4%14.3%7.3%
|align="center" valign=top bgcolor="pink"|65.5%
|align="left" valign=top bgcolor="lightgreen"|Andrea Dall'O(Liga Veneta–Lega Nord)
|align="center" valign=top bgcolor="lightgreen"|11.2%
|align="center" valign=top bgcolor="lightgreen"|-
|align="center" valign=top bgcolor="#E9E9E9"|5.3%
|-
|align="left" valign=top bgcolor="#E9E9E9"|Padua
|align="left" valign=top bgcolor="lightblue"|Vittorio Casarin(Forza Italia)
|align="center" valign=top bgcolor="lightblue"|43.1%
|align="center" valign=top bgcolor="lightblue"|55.4%
|align="left" valign=top bgcolor="pink"|Antonino Ziglio(Italian People's Party)
|align="center" valign=top bgcolor="pink"|39.7%
|align="center" valign=top bgcolor="pink"|44.6%
|align="left" valign=top bgcolor="lightgreen"|Flavio Minzolini(Liga Veneta–Lega Nord)
|align="center" valign=top bgcolor="lightgreen"|7.3%
|align="center" valign=top bgcolor="lightgreen"|-
|align="center" valign=top bgcolor="#E9E9E9"|6.1%
|-
|align="left" valign=top bgcolor="#E9E9E9"|Rovigo
|align="left" valign=top bgcolor="lightblue"|Alberto Brigo(United Christian Democrats)Andrea Previati(National Alliance)
|align="center" valign=top bgcolor="lightblue"|26.9%11.5%
|align="center" valign=top bgcolor="lightblue"|41.7%
|align="left" valign=top bgcolor="pink"|Federico Saccardin(Democrat of the Left)
|align="center" valign=top bgcolor="pink"|48.4%
|align="center" valign=top  bgcolor="pink"|58.3%
|align="left" valign=top bgcolor="lightgreen"|Andrea Astolfi(Liga Veneta–Lega Nord)
|align="center" valign=top bgcolor="lightgreen"|5.3%
|align="center" valign=top bgcolor="lightgreen"|-
|align="center" valign=top bgcolor="#E9E9E9"|7.9%
|-
|align="left" valign=top bgcolor="#E9E9E9"|Venice
|align="left" valign=top bgcolor="lightblue"|Luciano Falcier(Forza Italia)
|align="center" valign=top bgcolor="lightblue"|35.8%
|align="center" valign=top bgcolor="lightblue"|43.7%
|align="left" valign=top bgcolor="pink"|Luigino Busatto(Democrats of the Left)Maria Luisa Semi(The Democrats)
|align="center" valign=top bgcolor="pink"|39.6%8.2%
|align="center" valign=top  bgcolor="pink"|56.3%
|align="left" valign=top bgcolor="lightgreen"|Alberto Mazzonetto(Liga Veneta–Lega Nord)
|align="center" valign=top  bgcolor="lightgreen"|7.8%
|align="center" valign=top bgcolor="lightgreen"|-
|align="center" valign=top bgcolor="#E9E9E9"|8.6%
|-
|align="left" valign=top bgcolor="#E9E9E9"|Verona
|align="left" valign=top bgcolor="lightblue"|Aleardo Merlin(Forza Italia)
|align="center" valign=top bgcolor="lightblue"|41.5%
|align="center" valign=top bgcolor="lightblue"|53.0%
|align="left" valign=top bgcolor="pink"|Franco Bonfante(Democrats of the Left)
|align="center" valign=top bgcolor="pink"|29.8%
|align="center" valign=top bgcolor="pink"|47.0%
|align="left" valign=top bgcolor="lightgreen"|Stefano Zaninelli(Liga Veneta–Lega Nord)
|align="center" valign=top bgcolor="lightgreen"|15.0%
|align="center" valign=top bgcolor="lightgreen"|-
|align="center" valign=top bgcolor="#E9E9E9"|8.2%
|}
Source: Istituto Cattaneo

2002 provincial elections

|- 
!align=left rowspan=2 valign=center bgcolor="#E9E9E9"|
!colspan="3" align="center" valign=top bgcolor="lightblue"|House of Freedoms
!colspan="3" align="center" valign=top bgcolor="pink"|The Olive Tree
!colspan="3" align="center" valign=top bgcolor="lightgreen"|Lega Nord
!colspan="1" align="center" valign=top bgcolor="#E9E9E9"|Others
|-
|align="left" bgcolor="lightblue"|candidate
|align="center" bgcolor="lightblue"|1st round
|align="center" bgcolor="lightblue"|2nd round
|align="left" bgcolor="pink"|candidate
|align="center" bgcolor="pink"|1st round
|align="center" bgcolor="pink"|2nd round
|align="left" bgcolor="lightgreen"|candidate
|align="center" bgcolor="lightgreen"|1st round
|align="center" bgcolor="lightgreen"|2nd round
|align="center" bgcolor="#E9E9E9"|1st round
|-
|align="left" valign=top bgcolor="#E9E9E9" |Treviso
|align="left" valign=top bgcolor="lightblue" |Francesco Giacomin(Forza Italia)
|align="center" valign=top bgcolor="lightblue" |25.1%
|align="center" valign=top bgcolor="lightblue"|-
|align="left" valign=top bgcolor="pink"|Diego Bottacin(Democracy is Freedom)
|align="center" valign=top bgcolor="pink"|25.4%
|align="center" valign=top bgcolor="pink"|31.1%
|align="left" valign=top bgcolor="lightgreen"|Luca Zaia(Liga Veneta–Lega Nord)
|align="center" valign=top bgcolor="lightgreen"|43.3%
|align="center" valign=top bgcolor="lightgreen"|68.9%
|align="center" valign=top bgcolor="#E9E9E9"|6.2%
|-
|align="left" valign=top bgcolor="#E9E9E9" |Vicenza
|align="left" valign=top bgcolor="lightblue" |Manuela Dal Lago(Liga Veneta–Lega Nord)
|align="center" valign=top bgcolor="lightblue" |57.0%
|align="center" valign=top bgcolor="lightblue"|-
|align="left" valign=top bgcolor="pink"|Giuseppe Berlato Sella(Democracy is Freedom)
|align="center" valign=top bgcolor="pink"|35.2%
|align="center" valign=top bgcolor="pink"|-
|align="left" valign=top bgcolor="lightgreen"|
|align="center" valign=top bgcolor="lightgreen"|
|align="center" valign=top bgcolor="lightgreen"|
|align="center" valign=top bgcolor="#E9E9E9"|7.8%
|}
Source: La Repubblica

2004 provincial elections

|- 
!align=left rowspan=2 valign=center bgcolor="#E9E9E9"|
!colspan="3" align="center" valign=top bgcolor="lightblue"|House of Freedoms
!colspan="3" align="center" valign=top bgcolor="pink"|The Olive Tree
!colspan="3" align="center" valign=top bgcolor="lightgreen"|Lega Nord
!colspan="1" align="center" valign=top bgcolor="#E9E9E9"|Others
|-
|align="left" bgcolor="lightblue"|candidate
|align="center" bgcolor="lightblue"|1st round
|align="center" bgcolor="lightblue"|2nd round
|align="left" bgcolor="pink"|candidate
|align="center" bgcolor="pink"|1st round
|align="center" bgcolor="pink"|2nd round
|align="left" bgcolor="lightgreen"|candidate
|align="center" bgcolor="lightgreen"|1st round
|align="center" bgcolor="lightgreen"|2nd round
|align="center" bgcolor="#E9E9E9"|1st round
|-
|align="left" valign=top bgcolor="#E9E9E9" |Belluno
|align="left" valign=top bgcolor="lightblue" |Floriano Pra(Forza Italia)
|align="center" valign=top bgcolor="lightblue" |40.2%
|align="center" valign=top bgcolor="lightblue"|43.8%
|align="left" valign=top bgcolor="pink"|Sergio Reolon(Democracy is Freedom)
|align="center" valign=top bgcolor="pink"|39.2%
|align="center" valign=top bgcolor="pink"|56.2%
|align="left" bgcolor="lightgreen"|Gianvittore Vaccari(Liga Veneta–Lega Nord)
|align="center" valign=top bgcolor="lightgreen"|9.7%
|align="center" valign=top bgcolor="lightgreen"|with Pra
|align="center" valign=top bgcolor="#E9E9E9"|11.1%
|-
|align="left" valign=top bgcolor="#E9E9E9"|Padua
|align="left" valign=top bgcolor="lightblue"|Vittorio Casarin(Forza Italia)
|align="center" valign=top bgcolor="lightblue"|44.2%
|align="center" valign=top bgcolor="lightblue"|51.0%
|align="left" valign=top bgcolor="pink"|Franco Frigo(Democracy is Freedom)
|align="center" valign=top bgcolor="pink"|41.8%
|align="center" valign=top bgcolor="pink"|49.0%
|align="left" valign=top bgcolor="lightgreen"|Maurizio Conte(Liga Veneta–Lega Nord)
|align="center" valign=top bgcolor="lightgreen"|8.8%
|align="center" valign=top bgcolor="lightgreen"|with Casarin
|align="center" valign=top bgcolor="#E9E9E9"|5.2%
|-
|align="left" valign=top bgcolor="#E9E9E9"|Rovigo
|align="left" valign=top bgcolor="lightblue"|Renzo Marangon(Forza Italia)
|align="center" valign=top bgcolor="lightblue"|37.2%
|align="center" valign=top bgcolor="lightblue"|-
|align="left" valign=top bgcolor="pink"|Federico Saccardin(Democracy is Freedom)
|align="center" valign=top bgcolor="pink"|50.6%
|align="center" valign=top  bgcolor="pink"|-
|align="left" valign=top bgcolor="lightgreen"|Franco Secchieri(Liga Veneta–Lega Nord)
|align="center" valign=top bgcolor="lightgreen"|5.9%
|align="center" valign=top bgcolor="lightgreen"|-
|align="center" valign=top bgcolor="#E9E9E9"|6.3%
|-
|align="left" valign=top bgcolor="#E9E9E9"|Venice
|align="left" valign=top bgcolor="lightblue"|Carlo Alberto Tesserin(Forza Italia)
|align="center" valign=top bgcolor="lightblue"|32.3%
|align="center" valign=top bgcolor="lightblue"|-
|align="left" valign=top bgcolor="pink"|Davide Zoggia(Democrats of the Left)
|align="center" valign=top bgcolor="pink"|50.5%
|align="center" valign=top  bgcolor="pink"|-
|align="left" valign=top bgcolor="lightgreen"|Giovanni Anci(Liga Veneta–Lega Nord)
|align="center" valign=top  bgcolor="lightgreen"|8.2%
|align="center" valign=top bgcolor="lightgreen"|-
|align="center" valign=top bgcolor="#E9E9E9"|9.0%
|-
|align="left" valign=top bgcolor="#E9E9E9"|Verona
|align="left" valign=top bgcolor="lightblue"|Elio Mosele(Forza Italia)
|align="center" valign=top bgcolor="lightblue"|39.2%
|align="center" valign=top bgcolor="lightblue"|52.5%
|align="left" valign=top bgcolor="pink"|Gustavo Franchetto(Democracy is Freedom)
|align="center" valign=top bgcolor="pink"|37.9%
|align="center" valign=top bgcolor="pink"|47.5%
|align="left" valign=top bgcolor="lightgreen"|Flavio Tosi(Liga Veneta–Lega Nord)
|align="center" valign=top bgcolor="lightgreen"|13.2%
|align="center" valign=top bgcolor="lightgreen"|with Mosele
|align="center" valign=top bgcolor="#E9E9E9"|9.7%
|}
Source: Istituto Cattaneo

2006 provincial elections

|- 
!align=left rowspan=2 valign=center bgcolor="#E9E9E9"|
!colspan="3" align="center" valign=top bgcolor="lightblue"|House of Freedoms (incl. Lega Nord)
!colspan="3" align="center" valign=top bgcolor="pink"|The Union
!colspan="3" align="center" valign=top bgcolor="#FBEC5D"|North-East Project
!colspan="1" align="center" valign=top bgcolor="#E9E9E9"|Others
|-
|align="left" bgcolor="lightblue"|candidate
|align="center" bgcolor="lightblue"|1st round
|align="center" bgcolor="lightblue"|2nd round
|align="left" bgcolor="pink"|candidate
|align="center" bgcolor="pink"|1st round
|align="center" bgcolor="pink"|2nd round
|align="left" bgcolor="#FBEC5D"|candidate
|align="center" bgcolor="#FBEC5D"|1st round
|align="center" bgcolor="#FBEC5D"|2nd round
|align="center" bgcolor="#E9E9E9"|1st round
|-
|align="left" valign=top bgcolor="#E9E9E9" |Treviso
|align="left" valign=top bgcolor="lightblue" |Leonardo Muraro(Liga Veneta–Lega Nord)
|align="center" valign=top bgcolor="lightblue" |57.3%
|align="center" valign=top bgcolor="lightblue"|-
|align="left" valign=top bgcolor="pink"|Lorenzo Biagi(Democracy is Freedom)
|align="center" valign=top bgcolor="pink"|30.2%
|align="center" valign=top bgcolor="pink"|-
|align="left" bgcolor="#FBEC5D"|Giorgio Panto(North-East Project)
|align="center" valign=top bgcolor="#FBEC5D"|10.3%
|align="center" valign=top bgcolor="#FBEC5D"|-
|align="center" valign=top bgcolor="#E9E9E9"|2.2%
|}
Source: Istituto Cattaneo

2007 provincial elections

|- 
!align=left rowspan=2 valign=center bgcolor="#E9E9E9"|
!colspan="3" align="center" valign=top bgcolor="lightblue"|House of Freedoms (incl. Lega Nord)
!colspan="3" align="center" valign=top bgcolor="pink"|The Union
!colspan="3" align="center" valign=top bgcolor="#CCCCFF"|VPPE, DC, LVR, etc.
!colspan="1" align="center" valign=top bgcolor="#E9E9E9"|Others
|-
|align="left" bgcolor="lightblue"|candidate
|align="center" bgcolor="lightblue"|1st round
|align="center" bgcolor="lightblue"|2nd round
|align="left" bgcolor="pink"|candidate
|align="center" bgcolor="pink"|1st round
|align="center" bgcolor="pink"|2nd round
|align="left" bgcolor="#CCCCFF"|candidate
|align="center" bgcolor="#CCCCFF"|1st round
|align="center" bgcolor="#CCCCFF"|2nd round
|align="center" bgcolor="#E9E9E9"|1st round
|-
|align="left" valign=top bgcolor="#E9E9E9"|Vicenza
|align="left" valign=top bgcolor="lightblue" |Attilio Schneck(Liga Veneta–Lega Nord)
|align="center" valign=top bgcolor="lightblue" |60.0%
|align="center" valign=top bgcolor="lightblue"|-
|align="left" valign=top bgcolor="pink"|Pietro Collareda(Democracy is Freedom)
|align="center" valign=top bgcolor="pink"|17.2%
|align="center" valign=top bgcolor="pink"|-
|align="left" bgcolor="#CCCCFF"|Giorgio Carollo(Veneto for the EPP)
|align="center" valign=top bgcolor="#CCCCFF"|9.9%
|align="center" valign=top bgcolor="#CCCCFF"|-
|align="center" valign=top bgcolor="#E9E9E9"|13.0%
|}
Source: La Repubblica

2009 provincial elections

|- 
!align=left rowspan=2 valign=center bgcolor="#E9E9E9"|
!colspan="3" align="center" valign=top bgcolor="lightblue"|The People of Freedom & Lega Nord
!colspan="3" align="center" valign=top bgcolor="pink"|Democratic Party and allies
!colspan="3" align="center" valign=top bgcolor="#CCCCFF"|Union of the Centre
!colspan="1" align="center" valign=top bgcolor="#E9E9E9"|Others
|-
|align="left" bgcolor="lightblue"|candidate
|align="center" bgcolor="lightblue"|1st round
|align="center" bgcolor="lightblue"|2nd round
|align="left" bgcolor="pink"|candidate
|align="center" bgcolor="pink"|1st round
|align="center" bgcolor="pink"|2nd round
|align="left" bgcolor="#CCCCFF"|candidate
|align="center" bgcolor="#CCCCFF"|1st round
|align="center" bgcolor="#CCCCFF"|2nd round
|align="center" bgcolor="#E9E9E9"|1st round
|-
|align="left" valign=top bgcolor="#E9E9E9" |Belluno
|align="left" valign=top bgcolor="lightblue"|Gianpaolo Bottacin(Liga Veneta–Lega Nord)
|align="center" valign=top bgcolor="lightblue"|47.1%
|align="center" valign=top bgcolor="lightblue"|51.1%
|align="left" valign=top bgcolor="pink"|Sergio Reolon(Democratic Party)
|align="center" valign=top bgcolor="pink"|41.2%
|align="center" valign=top bgcolor="pink"|48.9%
|align="left" bgcolor="#CCCCFF"|Luigi De Cesero(Union of the Centre)
|align="center" valign=top bgcolor="#CCCCFF"|8.0%
|align="center" valign=top bgcolor="#CCCCFF"|-
|align="center" valign=top bgcolor="#E9E9E9"|3.7%
|-
|align="left" valign=top bgcolor="#E9E9E9" |Padua
|align="left" valign=top bgcolor="lightblue"|Barbara Degani(The People of Freedom)
|align="center" valign=top bgcolor="lightblue"|53.9%
|align="center" valign=top bgcolor="lightblue"|-
|align="left" valign=top bgcolor="pink"|Antonio Albuzio(Italy of Values)
|align="center" valign=top bgcolor="pink"|30.6%
|align="center" valign=top bgcolor="pink"|-
|align="left" bgcolor="#CCCCFF"|Antonio De Poli(Union of the Centre)
|align="center" valign=top bgcolor="#CCCCFF"|11.3%
|align="center" valign=top bgcolor="#CCCCFF"|-
|align="center" valign=top bgcolor="#E9E9E9"|4.2%
|-
|align="left" valign=top bgcolor="#E9E9E9" |Rovigo
|align="left" valign=top bgcolor="lightblue"|Antonello Contiero(Liga Veneta–Lega Nord)
|align="center" valign=top bgcolor="lightblue"|48.7%
|align="center" valign=top bgcolor="lightblue"|47.7%
|align="left" valign=top bgcolor="pink"|Tiziana Virgili(Democratic Party)
|align="center" valign=top bgcolor="pink"|36.7%
|align="center" valign=top bgcolor="pink"|52.3%
|align="left" bgcolor="#CCCCFF"|Michele Raisi(Union of the Centre)
|align="center" valign=top bgcolor="#CCCCFF"|6.2%
|align="center" valign=top bgcolor="#CCCCFF"|-
|align="center" valign=top bgcolor="#E9E9E9"|8.3%
|-
|align="left" valign=top bgcolor="#E9E9E9" |Venice
|align="left" valign=top bgcolor="lightblue"|Francesca Zaccariotto(Liga Veneta–Lega Nord)
|align="center" valign=top bgcolor="lightblue"|48.4%
|align="center" valign=top bgcolor="lightblue"|51.9%
|align="left" valign=top bgcolor="pink"|Davide Zoggia(Democratic Party)
|align="center" valign=top bgcolor="pink"|41.9%
|align="center" valign=top bgcolor="pink"|48.1%
|align="left" bgcolor="#CCCCFF"|Ugo Bergamo(Union of the Centre)
|align="center" valign=top bgcolor="#CCCCFF"|5.6%
|align="center" valign=top bgcolor="#CCCCFF"|-
|align="center" valign=top bgcolor="#E9E9E9"|4.1%
|-
|align="left" valign=top bgcolor="#E9E9E9" |Verona
|align="left" valign=top bgcolor="lightblue"|Giovanni Miozzi(The People of Freedom)
|align="center" valign=top bgcolor="lightblue"|59.1%
|align="center" valign=top bgcolor="lightblue"|-
|align="left" valign=top bgcolor="pink"|Diego Zardini(Democratic Party)
|align="center" valign=top bgcolor="pink"|23.3%
|align="center" valign=top bgcolor="pink"|-
|align="left" bgcolor="#CCCCFF"|Mario Rossi(Union of the Centre)
|align="center" valign=top bgcolor="#CCCCFF"|8.4%
|align="center" valign=top bgcolor="#CCCCFF"|-
|align="center" valign=top bgcolor="#E9E9E9"|9.2%
|}
Source: La Repubblica

2011 provincial elections

|- 
!align=left rowspan=2 valign=center bgcolor="#E9E9E9"|
!colspan="3" align="center" valign=top bgcolor="lightblue"|The People of Freedom & Lega Nord
!colspan="3" align="center" valign=top bgcolor="pink"|Democratic Party and allies
!colspan="3" align="center" valign=top bgcolor="#CCCCFF"|Union of the Centre & North-East Union
!colspan="1" align="center" valign=top bgcolor="#E9E9E9"|Others
|-
|align="left" bgcolor="lightblue"|candidate
|align="center" bgcolor="lightblue"|1st round
|align="center" bgcolor="lightblue"|2nd round
|align="left" bgcolor="pink"|candidate
|align="center" bgcolor="pink"|1st round
|align="center" bgcolor="pink"|2nd round
|align="left" bgcolor="#CCCCFF"|candidate
|align="center" bgcolor="#CCCCFF"|1st round
|align="center" bgcolor="#CCCCFF"|2nd round
|align="center" bgcolor="#E9E9E9"|1st round
|-
|align="left" valign=top bgcolor="#E9E9E9" |Treviso
|align="left" valign=top bgcolor="lightblue" |Leonardo Muraro(Liga Veneta–Lega Nord)
|align="center" valign=top bgcolor="lightblue" |57.5%
|align="center" valign=top bgcolor="lightblue"|-
|align="left" valign=top bgcolor="pink"|Floriana Casellato(Democratic Party)
|align="center" valign=top bgcolor="pink"|32.9%
|align="center" valign=top bgcolor="pink"|-
|align="left" bgcolor="#CCCCFF"|Marco Zabotti(Union of the Centre)
|align="center" valign=top bgcolor="#CCCCFF"|6.8%
|align="center" valign=top bgcolor="#CCCCFF"|-
|align="center" valign=top bgcolor="#E9E9E9"|2.8%
|}
Source: Ministry of the Interior

Indirect elections (2014–present)

2014 provincial elections

Elections in Veneto
Veneto